Harry's is an American company that manufactures and sells shaving equipment and men's personal care products via online and retail channels. The company is known for their subscription service where customers receive new razor blades, shaving cream, and other grooming products by mail. Harry's is based in New York.

The company was founded in July 2012 by Andy Katz-Mayfield and Jeff Raider. The company launched its subscription service in 2013. In 2014, Harry's purchased the Feintechnik razor factory in Germany. In May 2019, Edgewell Personal Care announced it would purchase Harry's. In February 2020, the Federal Trade Commission sued Edgewell to block the merger, stating that the merger could hurt competition.

History 
The company was founded in July 2012 by Andy Katz-Mayfield and Jeff Raider, who met at Bain & Co. The company launched its subscription service in March 2013. In January 2014, Harry's acquired the German razor blade manufacturer Feintechnik for $100 million, in an effort to provide control over the entire process of manufacturing their products.

In July 2015 the company received a third-round financing of US$75.6 million.

In an interview published in July 2016, Katz-Mayfield said Harry's had two million customers.

As of January 2017, Harry's shaving products are also available at Target and Walmart stores.

In late June 2017, Harry's started selling its products in the United Kingdom.

In February 2018, Harry's raised $112 million in Series D funding co-led by Alliance Consumer Growth and Temasek co-led, with participation from Tao Capital Partners.

In October 2018, Harry's launched Flamingo, a women's skin care brand.

In May 2019, Edgewell Personal Care, the owner of the Schick brand of shaving products, announced plans to purchase Harry's for $1.4 billion. The merger was intended to finalise by the end of the first quarter of 2020. On February 3, 2020, the Federal Trade Commission sued Edgewell to block the merger, stating that bringing Schick and Harry's together could hurt competition and Edgewell backed away from the deal.

In March 2020, Harry's launched Cat Person as an independent startup out of the company's innovation group, Harry's Labs. Cat Person sells a lineup of cat care products.

Manufacturing
Harry's razor blades are manufactured at Feintechnik GmbH Eisfeld in Eisfeld, Germany. Feintechnik was founded in 1920, and was later nationalised in 1948 as VEB Feintechnik Eisfeld, which later privatized by German government agency Treuhand in 1990. Feintechnik was acquired by Harry's in January 2014 for $100 million. The handles of the Harry's razors are manufactured in China.

Business model
Similar to Warby Parker, which was also co-founded by Jeff Raider, Harry's began with a buy-one-donate-one business model, donating a free razor blade (or the cost of one) to charitable organizations.  The program started in 2013 by supporting The Mission Continues to help veterans returning from Iraq and Afghanistan, and it was called the "Give a Shave" program.  By the end of 2013, the "Give a Shave" program had changed slightly such that Harry's would donate 1% of their sales and the employees would donate 1% of their time to charitable organizations like City Year.  Currently, the donation model remains 1% of sales, and employees now receive five days of paid time off to volunteer with a registered non-profit organization.  Various charities have received this benefit, and Harry's has recently focused on promoting better mental health care for men and suicide prevention, making news for working with organizations such as Campaign Against Living Miserably (CALM), HEADstrong Foundation, and The Trevor Project.

See also

Dollar Shave Club
Warby Parker
Away
Outdoor Voices

References

External links 
 

Razor brands
Personal care brands
Shaving cream brands
Subscription services
American companies established in 2013
2013 establishments in New York City
Companies based in New York City
Male grooming brands